William James Mitchell (28 November 1890 – 2 June 1959) was a New Zealand rugby footballer who represented New Zealand in both rugby union and rugby league.

Early years
Mitchell was born in Melbourne, Australia before moving to New Zealand where he worked for the New Zealand Railways Department.

Rugby union career
Mitchell played rugby union for the Merivale club in Christchurch and represented the province nine times in 1909 and 1910. He was selected to be part of the All Blacks tour of Australia in 1910 and played in five matches, including the second and third Test matches.

Rugby league career
In 1911 Mitchell, along with three other players from the Merivale club, moved to Sydney and played for the North Sydney Bears. He was then enticed north by the Queensland Rugby League. At the same time the New Zealand rugby league side was touring Australia and he was invited to join the touring party. Mitchell played in four matches, becoming a dual-code rugby international.

Mitchell then returned to Christchurch and represented Canterbury in its first ever match in 1912. Mitchell toured Australia twice more with New Zealand, in 1913, and as captain in 1919. He played in his last match for New Zealand in 1920. He played for the St Albans and Federal clubs in the Canterbury Rugby League competition.

Later years
Mitchell later served as a coach of the Canterbury side and a national selector.

References

New Zealand rugby league administrators
New Zealand rugby league players
New Zealand national rugby league team players
1890 births
New Zealand rugby union players
1959 deaths
New Zealand international rugby union players
Rugby union wings
Rugby league wingers
Canterbury rugby union players
New Zealand people in rail transport
Canterbury rugby league team players
Canterbury rugby league team coaches
New Zealand national rugby league team captains
North Sydney Bears players
Rugby union players from Melbourne
Australian emigrants to New Zealand
Rugby league players from Melbourne